Brachodes rhagensis is a moth of the family Brachodidae. It is found in Iran.

The wingspan is about 29 mm for males and 24 mm for females.

References

Moths described in 1870
Brachodidae
Moths of the Middle East